Warren James Potent (born 7 April 1962) is an Australian sport shooter. He won the bronze medal in the 50 metre rifle prone at the 2008 Summer Olympics. He won two of the four competitions during the 2007 World Cup season. In the 2008 ISSF World Cup, he won two bronzes as well as the gold in the pre-Olympic event in Beijing, where he equalled Christian Klees's then world record for the final aggregate score. At the 2014 ISSF World Championships in Grenada he became the 50 metre rifle prone World Champion.

Olympic results

External links

 
 
 

1962 births
Australian male sport shooters
Commonwealth Games bronze medallists for Australia
Commonwealth Games gold medallists for Australia
Commonwealth Games silver medallists for Australia
ISSF rifle shooters
Living people
Medalists at the 2008 Summer Olympics
Olympic bronze medalists for Australia
Olympic medalists in shooting
Olympic shooters of Australia
People from Parramatta
Shooters at the 2000 Summer Olympics
Shooters at the 2004 Summer Olympics
Shooters at the 2008 Summer Olympics
Shooters at the 2010 Commonwealth Games
Shooters at the 2012 Summer Olympics
Shooters at the 2014 Commonwealth Games
Shooters at the 2016 Summer Olympics
Sportspeople from Sydney
World record holders in shooting
Commonwealth Games medallists in shooting
Medallists at the 2010 Commonwealth Games
Medallists at the 2014 Commonwealth Games